Bailur  is a village in the southern state of Karnataka, India, located in the Bhatkal taluk of Uttara Kannada district in Karnataka.

Demographics
 India census, Bailur had a population of 5940 with 2898 males and 3042 females.
St.Francis Xavier Church is  main attraction of Bailur.

See also
 Uttara Kannada
 Mangalore
 Districts of Karnataka

References

External links
 

Villages in Uttara Kannada district